Truvillion is a surname. Notable people with the surname include:

Eric Truvillion (born 1959), American football player
Tobias Truvillion (born 1975), American actor and model
 (born 1968), American basketball player

Americanized surnames